And the Band Played On is a 1993 American television film docudrama directed by Roger Spottiswoode. The teleplay by Arnold Schulman is based on the best-selling 1987 non-fiction book And the Band Played On: Politics, People, and the AIDS Epidemic by Randy Shilts, and is noteworthy for featuring both a vast historical scope, as well as an exceptionally sprawling cast.

The film premiered at the Montreal World Film Festival on September 2, 1993, before being broadcast on HBO on September 11, 1993. It later was released in the United Kingdom, Canada, Spain, Germany, Argentina, Austria, Italy, Sweden, the Netherlands, Belgium, France, Denmark, New Zealand, and Australia. The HBO movie was later aired on NBC in 1994. NBC (as well as ABC) were some of the networks considered to make a miniseries based on the book in the late 1980s, but the networks turned it down because they could not find a way to structure it as a two-night, four-hour miniseries. In 1994, NBC finally aired the movie with a parental discretion warning due to its sensitive subject matter.

Plot
In a prologue set in 1976, American epidemiologist Don Francis from the World Health Organization arrives in a village on the banks of the Ebola River in Zaire and discovers many of the residents and the doctor working with them have died from a mysterious illness later identified as Ebola hemorrhagic fever. It is his first exposure to such an epidemic, and the images of the dead he helps cremate will haunt him when he later becomes involved with HIV/AIDS research at the Centers for Disease Control and Prevention.

In 1981, Francis becomes aware of a growing number of deaths among gay men in Los Angeles, New York City and San Francisco due to a rare lung condition, Pneumocystis Pneumonia, which only afflicts people with weakened immune systems. He moves to Atlanta, where CDC Administrator Dr. James Curran asks him to begin an in-depth investigation into this new immune disorder. Because of the Reagan Administration's clampdown on public spending, he is forced to work with little money, limited space, and outdated equipment. He clashes with numerous members of the medical community (many of whom resent his involvement because of their personal agendas). He also comes into contact with the gay community after he and his colleagues find strong evidence that the disease is spread through sex. Some gay men support him, such as San Francisco activist Bill Kraus, while others express anger at what they see as unwanted interference in their lives, especially in his attempts to close the local gay bathhouses. Kraus works hard to try to save the gay community from the virus to the point that it costs him his relationship with boyfriend Kico Govantes. Francis and other CDC staff are further astonished that representatives of the blood industry are unwilling to do anything to try to curb the epidemic because of potential financial losses. Additionally, while Francis pursues his theory that AIDS is caused by a sexually transmitted virus, he finds his efforts are stymied due to competition between French scientists from the Pasteur Institute and American scientists, particularly Dr. Robert Gallo of the National Institutes of Health, who becomes enraged when he finds out that Francis collaborated with the French scientists. These researchers squabble over who should receive credit for discovering the virus and for development of a blood test. Meanwhile, the death toll climbs rapidly. One day in 1984, while exercising at a local gym, Kraus notices a spot on his ankle and worries that it might be Kaposi's sarcoma, an AIDS-defining illness. Kraus visits his doctor and is devastated upon learning that he has AIDS. Govantes returns to Kraus after finding out he is sick. After discovery of the AIDS virus is announced, Francis submits a plan for prevention and eventual cure despite Curran telling him that it will never be approved. The CDC rejects the proposal for being too expensive and transfers Francis to San Francisco. In November 1985, Kraus and Govantes are walking in the San Francisco candlelight parade when Kraus suddenly starts coughing and becomes too weak to stand. He is taken to a local hospital where he experiences difficulty with his vision and is only able to speak gibberish much of the time. Francis arrives, and within a few minutes, the symptoms pass. Francis laments that they could have stopped the virus from spreading but fears it might be too late. Kraus remarks that he used to be afraid of dying but now is afraid for those who live. Kraus passes away in January 1986. Francis stays at the CDC until 1992 when he leaves to work on the creation of an AIDS vaccine. The film ends with a playing of Elton John's "The Last Song" showing a photo and video montage of a number of famous people who are victims of HIV/AIDS.

Principal cast

Closing montage
The film closes with footage of a candlelight vigil and march in San Francisco, followed by a montage of images of numerous celebrities who have died of AIDS or were involved with HIV/AIDS education and research, accompanied by Elton John singing his "The Last Song." The montage includes:

 Bobbi Campbell
 Ryan White
 Rock Hudson
 Anthony Perkins
 Tina Chow
 Rudolf Nureyev
 Arthur Ashe
 Michael Bennett
 Liberace
 Freddie Mercury
 Elizabeth Glaser
 Magic Johnson
 Larry Kramer
 Alison Gertz
 Max Robinson
 Halston
 Willi Smith
 Perry Ellis
 Peter Allen
 Steve Rubell
 Keith Haring
 Stewart McKinney
 Denholm Elliott
 Brad Davis
 Amanda Blake
 Robert Reed
 Michel Foucault
 Tom Waddell

Critical reception
Most reviewers agreed that the filmmakers had a daunting task in adapting Shilts's massive, fact-filled text into a dramatically coherent film. Many critics praised the results. Film review website Rotten Tomatoes gives the film a 100% "Fresh" rating based on eight reviews.

Tony Scott of Variety stated that "if there are lapses, director Spottiswoode's engrossing, powerful work still accomplishes its mission: Shilts's book, with all its shock, sorrow and anger, has been transferred decisively to the screen."

John O'Connor of The New York Times agreed that the adaptation "adds up to tough and uncommonly courageous television. Excessive tinkering has left the pacing of the film sluggish in spots, but the story is never less than compelling."

Ken Tucker of Entertainment Weekly graded the film B+ and called it an "intriguing, sometimes awkward, always earnest combination of docudrama, medical melodrama, and mystery story. The stars lend warmth to a movie necessarily preoccupied with cold research and politics, and they lend prestige: The movie must be important, since actors of this stature agreed to appear. The result of the stars' generosity, however, works against the movie by halting the flow of the drama every time a familiar face pops up on screen. The emotions and agony involved in this subject give Band an irresistible power, yet the movie's rhythm is choppy and the dialogue frequently stiff and clichéd. The best compliment one can pay this TV movie is to say that unlike so many fact-based films, it does not exploit or diminish the tragedy of its subject."

In a review from Time Out New York, the writing team thought "so keen were the makers of this adaptation of Randy Shilts's best-seller to bombard us with the facts and figures of the history of AIDS that they forgot to offer a properly dramatic human framework to make us care fully about the characters." The review also says that the multiple issues the film attempts to cover "make for a disjointed, clichéd narrative."

Richard Zoglin of Time magazine wrote "Shilts's prodigiously researched 600-page book has been boiled down to a fact-filled, dramatically coherent, occasionally moving 2 hours and 20 minutes. At a time when most made-for-TV movies have gone tabloid crazy, here is a rare one that tackles a big subject, raises the right issues, fights the good fight."

The team from Channel 4 believed the film "is stifled by good intentions and a distractingly generous cast of stars in leads and cameos."

Accolades

See also

 1993 in television
 The Normal Heart (2014) – An HBO film also regarding the early years of the HIV/AIDS crisis in the United States

References

External links

 
 

1993 television films
1993 drama films
1993 LGBT-related films
1993 films
1990s American films
1990s English-language films
American drama television films
American films based on actual events
American LGBT-related television films
Drama films based on actual events
Films about viral outbreaks
Films based on non-fiction books
Films directed by Roger Spottiswoode
Films scored by Carter Burwell
Gay-related films
HBO Films films
HIV/AIDS in American films
HIV/AIDS in television
LGBT-related films based on actual events
Primetime Emmy Award for Outstanding Made for Television Movie winners
Television films based on actual events
Television films based on books